Mikhail Vasilyevich Krunichev (– June 2, 1961) was a Soviet statesman, lieutenant-general in the technical and engineering corps (1944), who was awarded the title of Soviet Hero of Socialist Labour in 1945. 

Krunichev became a member of the Communist Party of the Soviet Union in 1921. He was Minister of Aviation Industry from 1946, and Deputy Chairman of the Council of Ministers from 1955 to 1957 and again in 1961.

References
 Great Soviet Encyclopedia, 3rd Edition, ed.  A. M. Prokhorov 1978, Publishing House Soviet Encyclopedia

1901 births
1961 deaths
Communist Party of the Soviet Union members
People's commissars and ministers of the Soviet Union
Heroes of Socialist Labour
Burials at the Kremlin Wall Necropolis